Silvano Davo (26 February 1942 – 5 January 2019) was an Italian racing cyclist. He rode in the 1971 Tour de France.

References

1945 births
2019 deaths
Italian male cyclists
Place of birth missing